Rex (founded 1872) is a New Orleans Carnival Krewe which stages one of the city's most celebrated parades on Mardi Gras Day.  Rex is Latin for "King", and Rex reigns as "The King of Carnival".

History and formation 
Rex was organized by New Orleans businessmen in part to put on a spectacle in honour of the New Orleans visit of Grand Duke Alexei Alexandrovich of Russia (remembered locally as "Grand Duke Alexis") during the 1872 Carnival season. Also in the minds of the founders of Rex was the desire to lure tourism and business to New Orleans in the years after the American Civil War.

Rex has held more parades in New Orleans than any other parading organization.  Its official song is "If Ever I Cease to Love", a quirky tune from the 1870s musical "Bluebeard". This was adopted because the Grand Duke Alexis of Russia had a fondness for Lydia Thompson, the actress who sang the song in the musical, which was playing in New Orleans at the time of the first Rex parade in 1872.  It has stuck around since then and is played often during Carnival.

Membership 
Traditionally, the secretive membership was restricted to New Orleans residents of European ancestry for most of its history, typically being elected from the membership rolls of The Boston Club including the first Rex, Louis Solomon a Jewish businessman. However, in 1991 the New Orleans city council passed an ordinance that required social organizations, including Mardi Gras Krewes, to certify publicly that they did not discriminate on the basis of race, religion, gender, or sexual orientation, in order to obtain parade permits and other public licensure. In effect, the ordinance required these, and other, private social groups to abandon their traditional code of secrecy and identify their members for the city's Human Relations Commission. The Mistick Krewe of Comus (along with Momus and Proteus, other 19th century Krewes) withdrew from parading rather than identify its membership. Rex decided to comply with the new ordinance, rather than disappear from the main event of Mardi Gras Day.
Two federal courts later declared that the ordinance was an unconstitutional infringement on First Amendment rights of free association and an unwarranted intrusion on the privacy of the groups subject to the ordinance. The decision of the Fifth Circuit Court of Appeals appears at volume 42, page 1483 of the Federal Reporter (3rd Series), or 42 F.3d 1483 (5th Cir. 1995). The Supreme Court refused to hear the city's appeal from this decision. Despite this, the other legendary krewes have not returned to the streets to parade. (Proteus later returned in 2000).

The Rex organization and the Mistick Krewe of Comus still hold their annual balls together on Mardi Gras night.

Parade 

Rex assembles floats using techniques that have spanned generations, entirely by hand. Contrary to popular belief, Rex floats are not built over Civil War-era cotton wagons; they are instead built on wagons formerly employed by the City of New Orleans to collect refuse in the late 19th century.

The Rex parade is put on by The School of Design.

Since 1971, the parade has started at the corner of Napoleon Avenue and South Claiborne Avenue, proceeding south (river bound) on Napoleon to St. Charles Avenue, then east (downtown bound) on St. Charles to Canal Street. Unlike some other old-line krewes, Rex's route never went through the French Quarter prior to the city's ban on parades in the Vieux Carre which took effect in 1973.

Parade themes 
The theme for each year's parade is decided more than a year in advance, and as soon as the parade is over on Mardi Gras Day, float artists begin work on the next year's parade. It takes thousands of man hours to create an entirely new parade, and it is for this reason, as well as the organization's commitment to its history and traditions, that many consider the Rex parade to be the highlight and most beautiful sight of New Orleans carnival.

Royal court 
One member of the Rex Organization is each year chosen to be the monarch of the organization; he is often incorrectly referred to by the (technically redundant) phrase "King Rex".  The correct title is simply "Rex". The identity of Rex is made public on Lundi Gras, the day before Mardi Gras.  Rex is always a prominent person in the city, one who is usually involved in several philanthropic and civic causes.  Being chosen Rex is one of the highest civic honors a person can receive in New Orleans.  The Mayor of New Orleans traditionally hands over the key to the city of New Orleans to Rex for Mardi Gras Day.

A consort is also chosen each year for Rex and she is titled the "Queen of Carnival".  The queen is always a debutante of the current season.  Like Rex, the queen is chosen in the spring of the previous year, and must keep her identity secret until Lundi Gras.

Ball 
In addition to its famous parade, the Rex Organization also holds a private ball for its membership and invited guests on Mardi Gras night.  In the 1950s, this ball made headlines when the Duke and Duchess of Windsor bowed down to Rex and the Queen of Carnival.

In recent decades, the Rex ball is held on one side of the Municipal Auditorium, while on the other half of the building at the same time, the Mistick Krewe (the oldest krewe), holds its ball.

Meeting of the courts 
A rich tradition is that Comus of the Mistick Krewe extends an invitation to Rex and his queen to join him and his consort at the ball of the Mistick Krewe.  This is called the "Meeting of the Courts", and when the monarchs have all made their exits, the Captain of the Mistick Krewe closes the curtain on the Carnival season.  This event is televised live locally (and to selected areas outside of the city) – and many New Orleanians stay up to watch despite their weariness – until the very end.

The Municipal Auditorium was damaged during Hurricane Katrina and in recent years the organizations have held their balls in the Sheraton and Marriott Hotels on Canal Street, rolling out a red carpet for the Rex court to cross Canal Street to attend the Meeting of the Courts.

Le Boeuf Gras 
In early Mardi Gras celebrations parades would include a live ox or Boeuf Gras (fatted ox). The ox represented the last meat to be eaten before the beginning of Lent.

The first appearance of Boeuf Gras in a modern parading Krewe was the Mistick Krewe 1867 parade entitled "Triumphs of Epicurus" including masked and costumed krewemen representing food and beverages with boeuf gras included.

Beouf gras was included in the first Rex parade decorated with garland and ribbons directly behind Rex. Legend has it that Old Jeff, a stockyard bull from Arabi, was used in later years.

In 1900 Boeuf Gras was taken out of the Rex parade as it was thought outsiders to traditional Mardi Gras would not understand. By proclamation from Rex usage of a live ox “was not in harmony with the beautiful displays which are produced in this era and (it) must be relegated to the past.”

In 1959 Rex issued another proclamation announcing the return of boeuf gras as a papier-mâché float design.

Today le boeuf gras is float 4 in the Rex parade and is surrounded by masked krewemen costumed as butchers and bakers many of whom are past kings of Carnival.

Pro Bono Publico 
Since its founding in 1872, a few years after the civil war, Rex has constantly held itself to a tradition of public service.  The Rex motto, "Pro Bono Publico" (for the public good) was adopted during this time, and continues to define the organization's commitment to service.

Following Hurricane Katrina, Rex organized a series of community service initiatives in 2006 under the banner "Operation Pro Bono Publico." The efforts of Rex targeted specific community needs such as support for police and other first responders, an organized clean-up effort of the Uptown parade route after Mardi Gras, as well as continued efforts to support New Orleans' Charter Schools.

Mardi Gras Colors 
Rex established purple, green, and gold as the official colors of Mardi Gras in 1892. The three colors symbolize justice, faith, and power.

Gallery

Bulletin

Floats and Costumes

Invitation

Parade

Proclimation

Tableau

See also
The Boston Club
Mistick Krewe

References

External links
 Rex Organization Official Site

Parades in the United States
Mardi Gras in New Orleans
1872 establishments in Louisiana
Recurring events established in 1872